The Delhi cricket team is a first-class cricket team based in Delhi, run by the Delhi & District Cricket Association, that plays in India's first class competition, the Ranji Trophy and limited-overs Vijay Hazare Trophy and Syed Mushtaq Ali Trophy. They have won the Ranji Trophy seven times and have been runners-up eight. Their latest title in 2007-08 came after a long wait of 16 years. The previous win was in the 1991–92 season when they beat Tamil Nadu in the final. The team's home ground is Arun Jaitley Stadium.

Competition history
Delhi have made a strong performance in the Ranji Trophy throughout its history. Three of its five wins came in the 1980s and the remainder were in the late 1970s, a period marked by the dominance of a famous Mumbai team. This formed a golden period for Delhi between 1978 and 1987: it was in the finals for all but one of those years (winning 4, runner up in 4).

Its six appearances in the Irani Trophy showed mixed results, losing to the Rest of India side four times and winning twice.

They have only two titles in limited overs cricket. They won the Vijay Hazare Trophy in 2012-13 under Rajat Bhatia. They won the Syed Mushtaq Ali Trophy under Pradeep Sangwan

Ranji Trophy

Irani Cup

Vijay Hazare Trophy

Syed Mushtaq Ali Trophy

Notable players

Players from Delhi who have played Test cricket for India, along with year of Test debut:
Prakash Bhandari (1955)
Man Sood (1960)
Mansoor Ali Khan Pataudi (Nawab of Pataudi) (1961)
Rajinder Pal (1964)
Ramesh Saxena (1967)
Ashok Gandotra (1969)
Madan Lal (1974)
Surinder Amarnath (1976)
Kirti Azad (1981)
Rakesh Shukla (1982)
Maninder Singh (1982)
Manoj Prabhakar (1984)
Raman Lamba (1987)
Ajay Sharma (1988)
Sanjeev Sharma (1988)
Vivek Razdan (1989)
Atul Wassan (1990)
Ashish Nehra (1999)
Robin Singh, Jr. (1999)
Nikhil Chopra (2000)
Vijay Dahiya (2000)
Rahul Sanghvi (2001)
Virender Sehwag (2001)
Aakash Chopra (2003)
Gautam Gambhir (2004)
Ishant Sharma (2007)
Virat Kohli (2011)
Shikhar Dhawan (2013)
Rishabh Pant (2018)
Navdeep Saini (2021)

Players from Delhi who have played ODI but not Test cricket for India, along with year of ODI debut:

Surinder Khanna (1979)
Amit Bhandari (2000)
Nitish Rana (2021)

Players from Delhi who have played T20I but not ODI or Test cricket for India, along with year of T20I debut:

Parvinder Awana (2012)
Pawan Negi (2016)

Cricketers from other state teams who also played for Delhi, and played Test cricket for India, along with year of Test debut:

Bishan Singh Bedi (1966)
Chetan Chauhan (1969)
Mohinder Amarnath (1969)
Arun Lal (1982)

Prominent cricketers at the domestic level:
Rajinder Goel
Krishnan Bhaskar Pillai
Arun Khurana
Mithun Manhas 
Rajat Bhatia
Unmukt Chand

Current squad 
Players with international caps are listed in bold.

Updated as on 24 January 2023

Coaching staff
 Head coach - Bhaskar Pillai
 Bowling Coach - Rajkumar Sharma
 Assistant coach - Amit Bhandari
 Manager - Manoj Kapoor
 Under-19s Coach - Madan Sharma
 Physio - Deepak Sury
 Trainers - Nishanta Bordoloi

References

External links
Cricinfo's Complete History of the Indian Domestic Competitions
Ranji Trophy 2006/7 Batting Averages
Ranji Trophy One Day 2006/7 Batting Averages
Inter State Twenty20 Tournament 2006/7 Batting Averages

Indian first-class cricket teams
Cricket in Delhi
1876 establishments in India
Cricket clubs established in 1876